Oleksandr Oleksiyovych Pavlyuk (Ukrainian: Олександр Олексійович Павлюк; born 20 August 1970) is a Ukrainian General. He was a participant of the War in Donbas and the 2022 Russian invasion of Ukraine. On 14 February 2023 he was appointed First Deputy Minister of Defense.

From 15 March 2022 until 21 May 2022 Pavlyuk was head (Governor) of Kyiv Oblast State Administration.

Biography
Pavlyuk was the commander of the Ukrainian peacekeeping forces in Kosovo from 2006 to 2007. He then commanded Operational Command West from 2017 to 2020, before being appointed as Commander of the training of the Land Forces Command of the Armed Forces of Ukraine in 2020.

On July 28, 2021, he was appointed the Commander of the Joint Forces. A command he held until 15 March 2022, when he was appointed commander of the “Kyiv Regional Military Administration”.

On 3 March 2022, President of Ukraine Volodymyr Zelenskyy conferred the title of "Hero of Ukraine" to Pavlyuk, citing his "personal courage and heroism", significantly contributing to the "protection of state sovereignty and territorial integrity of Ukraine". He was previously awarded the Order of Bohdan Khmelnytsky II class.

From 15 March 2022 until 21 May 2022 Pavlyuk was head (Governor) of Kyiv Oblast State Administration. According to Deputy Head of the Office of the President of Ukraine Kyrylo Tymoshenko Pavlyuk returned to military affairs. Oleksiy Kuleba succeeded him as Governor.

On 14 February 2023 Pavlyuk was appointed First Deputy Minister of Defense.

References

Recipients of the title of Hero of Ukraine
Lieutenant generals of Ukraine
Ukrainian military personnel of the 2022 Russian invasion of Ukraine
1970 births
Living people
People from Zviahel
Governors of Kyiv Oblast